The Bradford trolleybus system served the city of Bradford, Yorkshire, England for much of the 20th century.  It was one of the first two trolleybus systems to be opened in the United Kingdom, along with the Leeds system.

Both systems commenced operations on 20 June 1911.  However, the public service on the Bradford system did not start until four days later.  The Bradford system lasted the longest of all the UK's urban trolleybus systems. Having been one of the first two such systems to open, it was also the last one to close, on 26 March 1972. Just before its closure, it was also the longest-lived surviving trolleybus system in the world, but with the Bradford closure that distinction passed to the Shanghai, China, trolleybus system, opened in 1914.

Many of the former Bradford trolleybuses are now preserved at various locations around the UK, including eleven of them at the Trolleybus Museum at Sandtoft, Lincolnshire.

See also

 Transport in Bradford
 List of trolleybus systems in the United Kingdom

References

Notes

Further reading

External links

 Bradford Trolleybus Association
 National Trolleybus Archive
 British Trolleybus Society, based in Reading
 National Trolleybus Association, based in London

Trolleybuses
Defunct trolleybus systems by city
Trolleybus transport in the United Kingdom